Freddy Rodriguez (born January 17, 1975) is an American actor, best known for his roles as Federico Diaz on Six Feet Under (2001-2005), Gio on Ugly Betty (2007-2010), and Benny Colon in Bull (2016-2021).

Career
In 1995, he played Pedro Aragon, Jr., in A Walk in the Clouds with Keanu Reeves and Giancarlo Giannini and as a Vietnam veteran in Dead Presidents with Larenz Tate and Chris Tucker. Rodriguez went on to roles such as Ninja in The Pest, an obnoxious jock in Can't Hardly Wait and Carla's brother Marco on Scrubs. As a voice actor, he contributed the voice of Más y Menos on Teen Titans.

Rodriguez portrayed Federico Diaz on the hit HBO series Six Feet Under throughout its five seasons. For this role he received two Screen Actors Guild Awards for Best Ensemble in a Drama Series, an Emmy nomination for Best Supporting Actor in a Drama Series, and a further three SAG nominations (also in the ensemble category).

In 2005, Rodriguez played a vicious inner city drug dealer named Hector in the movie Havoc, and a jockey in the film Dreamer, co-starring Dakota Fanning. In 2006, appeared in the film Poseidon, as a waiter, as well as played Reggie, a character who only exercised one half of his body, in M. Night Shyamalan's film Lady in the Water, and starred alongside Eva Longoria and Christian Bale in Harsh Times, his first leading role in a major theatrical release. He was seen in an episode of the hit hospital television show ER, where he played a dying comic inspired by Bill Hicks.

Rodriguez starred alongside Roselyn Sanchez in the 2003 movie Chasing Papi, playing  "Victor" (directed by Linda Mendoza). He played busboy José Rojas in the 2006 film Bobby. He starred as El Wray in Planet Terror, Robert Rodriguez's portion of the double-feature film, Grindhouse (2007), and played the role of Gustavo Brambila in the true-life story Bottle Shock (2008). He appeared in the music video for the Santana song "Into the Night" and also made a cameo appearance as a pilot/flight attendant in the music video for the song "Glamorous" by Fergie. He starred in the popular video game Saints Row as the voice of Angelo Lopez and in the latest Merry Mixit Gap Christmas Commercial videos.

On July 13, 2007, Rodriguez was added to the cast of the ABC comedy series Ugly Betty, in which he played Giovanni Rossi, a sandwich shop owner who became the love interest for Betty Suarez (played by America Ferrera). He made his debut on the series at the start of the second season, appeared in an episode of the third season and reprised the role again late in the fourth season.

He played the character of CIA special operative Rick Martinez on the CBS series CHAOS.  He also starred in the NBC summer series The Night Shift as Michael Ragosa.

From 2016 to 2021, Rodriguez starred as attorney and former New York City prosecutor Benny Colón in the CBS courtroom drama Bull. In May 2021, multiple news outlets reported that, following the conclusion of two separate internal workplace investigations by CBS, Rodriguez and Bull showrunner Glenn Gordon Caron would not be returning for the series's sixth season.

Filmography

Television

Film

Video games

Music videos

See also
 List of notable Puerto Ricans

References

External links

Freddy Rodriguez's Official Twitter
Let Freddy Rodriguez show you around. — An Associated Press/asap Flash interactive, multimedia piece showing inside some of Freddy Rodriguez's world.

Living people
Male actors from Chicago
American male film actors
American male television actors
Year of birth missing (living people)
American male voice actors
American people of Puerto Rican descent
20th-century American male actors
21st-century American male actors